Stenoma adulans is a moth of the family Depressariidae. It is found in Peru and Pará, Brazil.

The wingspan is about 19 mm. The forewings are pale violet grey with the costal edge whitish ochreous. The plical and second discal stigmata are blackish grey. There is an evenly curved grey line from a blackish-grey thickening on the costa at four-fifths near the termen to the tornus. A marginal series of blackish dots are found around the apical part of the costa and termen. The hindwings are rather dark grey.

References

Moths described in 1925
Stenoma
Taxa named by Edward Meyrick